In mathematics, especially in algebraic K-theory, the algebraic K-group of a field is important to compute. For a finite field, the complete calculation was given by Daniel Quillen.

Low degrees
The map sending a finite-dimensional F-vector space to its dimension induces an isomorphism

for any field F. Next, 
 
the multiplicative group of F.
The second K-group of a field is described in terms of generators and relations by Matsumoto's theorem.

Finite fields 

For n=2, this can be seen from Matsumoto's theorem, in higher degrees it was computed by Quillen in conjunction with his work on the Adams conjecture.

Local and global fields 
 surveys the computations of K-theory of global fields (such as number fields and function fields), as well as local fields (such as p-adic numbers).

Algebraically closed fields
 showed that the torsion in K-theory is insensitive to extensions of algebraically closed fields. This statement is known as Suslin rigidity.

See also 
divisor class group

References 

 
 

 

 

Algebraic geometry